This is a summary of 1937 in music in the United Kingdom.

Events
24 January – Ernest John Moeran completes the revised version of his Symphony in G minor, dedicated to conductor Hamilton Harty.
6 March – Composer Benjamin Britten and his partner, the tenor Peter Pears, meet for the first time, in London.
12 May – William Walton's ceremonial march, "Crown Imperial", originally written for his predecessor, King Edward VIII, is performed for the first time at the coronation of King George VI and Queen Elizabeth.
27 August – Britten's Variations on a Theme of Frank Bridge is performed at the Salzburg Festival, conducted by Boyd Neel.
20 December – The Gaumont State Cinema opens in London with Sidney Torch as organist.
date unknown
Kathleen Ferrier wins the piano and vocal competitions at the Carlisle Festival, and is awarded a special rose bowl as champion of the festival.
George Lloyd marries Nancy Juvet. Lloyd suffers from PTSD and later acknowledges that he could not have recovered without Nancy's care. 
Ukrainian-born pianist Benno Moiseiwitsch takes up British citizenship.

Popular music
 "Did Your Mother Come From Ireland?" w.m. Jimmy Kennedy & Michael Carr
 "Harbour Lights" w. Jimmy Kennedy m. Hugh Williams
 "Home Town" w.m. Jimmy Kennedy & Michael Carr
 "The Lambeth Walk" w. Douglas Furber, L. Arthur Rose m. Noel Gay
 "Leaning On A Lamp Post" w.m. Noel Gay
 "Me And My Girl" w.m. Noel Gay & Douglas Furber

Classical music: new works
Arthur Bliss – Checkmate (ballet)
Rutland Boughton – Symphony No. 3 in B minor
Frank Bridge  String Quartet No. 4
Benjamin Britten – Variations on a Theme of Frank Bridge
George Dyson – Symphony in G major
John Ireland – These Things Shall Be
Edmund Rubbra – Symphony No. 1
Ralph Vaughan Williams – Job: A Masque for Dancing (ballet)
Percy Whitlock – Wessex Suite

Film and Incidental music
Richard Addinsell – Fire Over England, starring Laurence Olivier and Vivien Leigh.
Ernest Irving – Feather Your Nest, starring George Formby, Polly Ward and Enid Stamp-Taylor.

Musical theatre
5 February – On Your Toes London production opened at the Palace Theatre and ran for 123 performances
29 March – Swing is in the Air London revue opened at the Palladium
16 December – Me and My Girl (Noel Gay) – London production opened at the Victoria Palace Theatre and ran for 1646 performances.

Musical films
 Big Fella, directed by J. Elder Wills, starring Paul Robeson and Elisabeth Welch
 Calling All Stars, directed by Herbert Smith, starring Carroll Gibbons and Evelyn Dall
 Gangway, starring Jessie Matthews and Alastair Sim
 Head Over Heels, starring Jessie Matthews
 Mayfair Melody, directed by Arthur B. Woods, starring Keith Falkner and Chili Bouchier
 The Show Goes On, starring Gracie Fields, Owen Nares and John Stuart.
 Song of the Forge, starring Stanley Holloway.
 The Street Singer, starring Arthur Tracy, Margaret Lockwood and Arthur Riscoe
 Take My Tip, directed by Herbert Mason, starring Jack Hulbert and Cicely Courtneidge

Births
8 January – Shirley Bassey, singer
22 January – Ryan Davies, comedian, singer and songwriter (died 1977)
27 January – John Ogdon, pianist (died 1989)
28 April – Jean Redpath, folk singer (died 2014)
5 May – Delia Derbyshire, musician and composer of electronic music (died 2001)
12 July – Guy Woolfenden, conductor and theatre composer (died 2016)
27 July – Anna Dawson, actress and singer
19 November – Geoff Goddard, songwriter, singer and instrumentalist (died 2000)
30 November – Frank Ifield, British-born Australian singer
1 December 
Gordon Crosse, composer
David Measham, violinist and conductor (died 2005)
12 December – Philip Ledger, composer and teacher (died 2012)
31 December – Anthony Hopkins, actor and composer

Deaths
22 January – Walter Willson Cobbett, businessman and amateur violinist, editor/author of Cobbett's Cyclopedic Survey of Chamber Music, 89
10 April – Algernon Ashton, pianist and composer, 77
1 May – Herbert Hughes, composer, music critic and collector of folk songs, 54
2 May – Sir Arthur Somervell, composer, 73
23 July – Charles Henry Mills, composer and music teacher (b. 1873)
25 November – Lilian Baylis, founder of Sadler's Wells ballet company, 63 (heart attack)
23 December – Muriel Foster, contralto, 60
26 December
Dan Beddoe, tenor, 74
Ivor Gurney, composer and poet, 47 (tuberculosis)

See also
 1937 in British television
 1937 in the United Kingdom
 List of British films of 1937

References

British Music, 1937 in
Music
British music by year
1930s in British music